Antônio Dias is a Brazilian municipality located in the state of Minas Gerais. Its population  is estimated to be 9,275 people living in a total area of 877.844 km². The city belongs to the mesoregion of Vale do Rio Doce and to the microregion of Ipatinga.

See also
 List of municipalities in Minas Gerais
 Rubem Siqueira Maia

References

Municipalities in Minas Gerais